Nuliodon is a genus of spiders in the family Miturgidae. It was first described in 2009 by Raven. , it contains only one species, Nuliodon fishburni, found in Queensland.

References

Miturgidae
Monotypic Araneomorphae genera
Spiders of Australia